General of the Air Force (GAF) is a five-star general officer rank and is the highest possible rank in the United States Air Force. General of the Air Force ranks immediately above a general and is equivalent to General of the Army in the United States Army and fleet admiral in the United States Navy. The rank has been held only once, by General Henry H. Arnold, who had served as head of the United States Army Air Forces during World War II.

History

General Henry H. Arnold, commanding general of the United States Army Air Forces, became the first airman to be promoted to the five-star rank of general of the Army on 21 December 1944. The four other individuals promoted to the rank of General of the Army, all from the Army Ground Forces, were chief of staff of the United States Army George C. Marshall, supreme commander of the South West Pacific Area Douglas MacArthur, supreme commander of Supreme Headquarters Allied Expeditionary Force Dwight D. Eisenhower and commander of the Twelfth United States Army Group Omar Bradley. Four Navy admirals were also promoted to the five-star rank of fleet admiral, including William D. Leahy, Chief of Staff to the Commander in Chief, Ernest King, Chief of Naval Operations and commander-in-chief, United States Fleet, Chester W. Nimitz, commander-in-chief of the Pacific Ocean Areas and United States Pacific Fleet, and William Halsey Jr., commander of the South Pacific Area.

General of the Army Arnold retained the rank after the U.S. Air Force gained its independence from the U.S. Army on 18 September 1947. On 7 May 1949, under , Henry Arnold's official U.S. rank was redesignated from General of the Army to General of the Air Force. General of the Air Force Arnold is the only individual in the U.S. Armed Forces to possess two five-star ranks and is the only airman to have a five-star rank.

The Air Force currently declares that General of the Air Force is an active rank and it could again be bestowed at the discretion of the United States Congress. However, the President, with consent from the Senate, may award a fifth star at any time he sees fit.

In the 1990s, there were proposals in Department of Defense academic circles to bestow a five-star rank on the office of the Chairman of the Joint Chiefs of Staff.

In 2007 there was a proposal that the military leader in the Global War on Terrorism be promoted to a five-star rank.

Ranks senior to General of the Air Force

The only United States Armed Forces rank senior to General of the Air Force is General of the Armies. The rank of General of the Armies has only been granted to Generals John J. Pershing, Ulysses S. Grant and George Washington. No Air Force officer has ever been promoted to a rank senior to General of the Air Force.

See also
 List of United States four-star officers
 List of United States Air Force four-star generals
 List of United States military leaders by rank
 United States Air Force officer rank insignia

References

Titles held only by one person
Officer ranks of the United States Air Force
Five-star officers